Æðuvík (from Æða meaning "duck" and vík meaning "bay") is a community located on the southernmost tip of Eysturoy island of the Faroe Islands.

Founded in 1897, its postal code is FO 645. Its population is about 100, and it is located at N 62° 4' 11 W 6° 41' 24. The village is located in the Runavík municipality along with the Innan Glyvur, Runavík, Saltangará, Rituvík, Skipanes, Søldarfjørður, Elduvík, Funningsfjørður, Glyvrar, Oyndarfjørður, Skáli, Skálafjørður, Lambi, and Lambareiði villages.

See also
 List of towns in the Faroe Islands

References

External links
Faeroislands.dk page on Æðuvík.

Populated places in the Faroe Islands
Populated places established in 1897
Eysturoy